Concord Elementary School is the name of multiple elementary school in the United States of America:

 Concord Elementary School (Kentucky), in McCracken County, Kentucky
 Concord Elementary School (Pittsburgh), Pennsylvania
 Concord Elementary School (South Carolina), in Anderson, South Carolina
 Concord Elementary School (Seattle), a List of landmarks in Seattle, Washington
 Concord Elementary School (Edina, Minnesota)
 Concord School (Miccosukee), in Leon County, Florida

See also 
 Concord (disambiguation)